Tešanj RK is a Bosnian rugby club based in Tešanj. Because of a lack of player numbers they currently play in a joint team with RK Gladijatori Derventa.

External links
BiH klubovi - RUGBY.ba - Službena web stranica Ragbi Saveza BiH (in Bosnian)

Sport in Tešanj
Bosnia and Herzegovina rugby union teams